Luigi Danova (born 5 June 1952) is an Italian footballer who played as a defender. On 22 December 1976, he represented the Italy national football team on the occasion of a friendly match against Portugal in a 2–1 away loss. He also made 246 appearances for Torino between 1976 and 1985.

References

1952 births
Italian footballers
Italy international footballers
Association football defenders
Serie A players
Serie C players
Torino F.C. players
Juventus F.C. players
Como 1907 players
U.S. Lecce players
Mantova 1911 players
S.S.D. Varese Calcio players
Living people
A.C.D. Sant'Angelo 1907 players